The Canadian Track and Field Championships is an annual outdoor track and field competition organised by Athletics Canada, which serves as the Canadian national championship for the sport. The competition was first held in 1884 as a men's only event, with women's events being introduced in 1925. The event is typically reserved for Canadian nationals, though foreign athletes have entered (and won) as invited guests. The vast majority of foreign winners have come from either Great Britain or the United States.

Men

100 metres
Prior to 1967, the event was variously held over 100 metres or 100 yards.
1946: ?
1947: Roger Wellman
1948: Jack Parry
1949: Don Pettie
1950: Ted Haggis
1951: Raphael Duke
1952: Don McFarlane
1953: Don McFarlane
1954: 
1955: Joe Foreman
1956: Stan Levenson
1957: 
1958: 
1959: Harry Jerome
1960: Harry Jerome
1961: Robert Fisher-Smith
1962: Harry Jerome
1963: Larry Dunn
1964: Harry Jerome
1965: Ed Hearne
1966: Harry Jerome
1967: Ed Hearne
1968: Harry Jerome
1969: Harry Jerome
1970: Charlie Francis
1971: Charlie Francis
1972: Herman Carter
1973: Charlie Francis
1974: Hugh Fraser
1975: Hugh Fraser
1976: Cole Doty
1977: Hugh Fraser
1978: Hugh Fraser
1979: Desai Williams
1980: Desai Williams
1981: Desai Williams
1982: Tony Sharpe
1983: Desai Williams
1984: Ben Johnson
1985: Ben Johnson
1986: Ben Johnson
1987: Ben Johnson
1988: Ben Johnson
1989: Bruny Surin
1990: Bruny Surin
1991: Bruny Surin
1992: Glenroy Gilbert
1993: Atlee Mahorn
1994: Glenroy Gilbert
1995: Donovan Bailey
1996: Robert Esmie
1997: Donovan Bailey
1998: Bruny Surin
1999: Bruny Surin
2000: Bruny Surin
2001: Donovan Bailey
2002: Nicolas Macrozonaris
2003: Nicolas Macrozonaris
2004: Pierre Browne
2005: Pierre Browne

200 metres
Prior to 1967, the event was variously held over 200 metres or 220 yards.
1946: Don McFarlane
1947: John Turner
1948: Jack Parry
1949: Don Pettie
1950: Ted Haggis
1951: Robert Hutchison
1952: Peter Sutton
1953: Bruce Springbett
1954: 
1955: Joe Foreman
1956: Stan Levenson
1957: Laird Sloan
1958: Stan Levenson
1959: Harry Jerome
1960: Harry Jerome
1961: 
1962: Harry Jerome
1963: Larry Dunn
1964: Harry Jerome
1965: 
1966: Harry Jerome
1967: Don Domansky
1968: Harry Jerome
1969: Tony Powell
1970: Charlie Francis
1971: Charlie Francis
1972: Robert Martin
1973: Robert Martin
1974: Robert Martin
1975: Hugh Fraser
1976: Dacre Brown
1977: Desai Williams
1978: Dan Biocchi
1979: Desai Williams
1980: Desai Williams
1981: Desai Williams
1982: Desai Williams
1983: Desai Williams
1984: Tony Sharpe
1985: Ben Johnson
1986: Atlee Mahorn
1987: Ben Johnson
1988: Cyprean Enweani
1989: Cyprean Enweani
1990: Bradley McCuaig
1991: Atlee Mahorn
1992: Ricardo Greenidge
1993: Glenroy Gilbert
1994: Robert Esmie
1995: Atlee Mahorn
1996: Dave Tomlin
1997: Robert Esmie
1998: O'Brian Gibbons
1999: Glenn Smith
2000: Pierre Browne
2001: Shane Niemi
2002: Jermaine Joseph
2003: Nicolas Macrozonaris
2004: Anson Henry
2005: Anson Henry

400 metres
Prior to 1967, the event was variously held over 400 metres or 440 yards.
1946: Ernie McCullough
1947: Paul Chinette
1948: Bob McFarlane
1949: Ezra Henniger
1950: Bob McFarlane
1951: Jack Hutchins
1952: Jim Lavery
1953: Murray Cockburn
1954: 
1955: Dick Harding
1956: Terry Tobacco
1957: Laird Sloan
1958: Terry Tobacco
1959: Stan Worsfold
1960: Terry Tobacco
1961: Bill Crothers
1962: Bill Crothers
1963: Sig Ohleman
1964: Don McGarten
1965: Bill Crothers
1966: Ross Mackenzie
1967: Don Domansky
1968: Don Domansky
1969: Tony Powell
1970: Tony Powell
1971: Leighton Hope
1972: Craig Blackman
1973: Glenn Bogue
1974: Randy Jackson
1975: Brian Saunders
1976: Vic Remple
1977: Frank Van Doorn
1978: Brian Saunders
1979: Brian Saunders
1980: Peter Harper
1981: Tim Bethune
1982: Doug Hinds
1983: Brian Saunders
1984: Doug Hinds
1985: Andre Smith
1986: John Graham
1987: Anton Skerritt
1988: Carl Folkes
1989: Anton Skerritt
1990: Mike McLean
1991: Anthony Wilson
1992: Rayton Archer
1993: Troy Jackson
1994: Byron Goodwin
1995: Charles Allen
1996: Christopher Semenuk
1997: Alexandre Marchand
1998: Shane Niemi
1999: Shane Niemi
2000: Shane Niemi
2001: Shane Niemi
2002: Shane Niemi
2003: Shane Niemi
2004: Tyler Christopher
2005: Nathan Vadeboncoeur

800 metres
Prior to 1967, the event was variously held over 800 metres or 880 yards.
1946: ?
1947: Jack Hutchins
1948: Jack Hutchins
1949: Bob McFarlane
1950: Bob McFarlane
1951: Bill Parnell
1952: John Ross
1953: Richard Carmichael
1954: 
1955: Jack McRoberts
1956: Lyle Garbe
1957: 
1958: Joe Mullins
1959: Sig Ohleman
1960: Sig Ohleman
1961: Bill Crothers
1962: Bill Crothers
1963: Bill Crothers
1964: Bill Crothers
1965: Bill Crothers
1966: Bill Crothers
1967: Bill Crothers
1968: 
1969: Ergas Leps
1970: Ergas Leps
1971: Kenneth Elmer
1972: Bill Smart
1973: Randy Makolosky
1974: John Craig
1975: Kenneth Elmer
1976: Tom Griffin
1977: Bob Reindl
1978: Peter Favell
1979: Allan Godfrey
1980: Bruce Roberts
1981: Doug Wournell
1982: Cornell Messam
1983: Simon Hoogewerf
1984: Bruce Roberts
1985: Simon Hoogewerf
1986: Simon Hoogewerf
1987: Simon Hoogewerf
1988: Simon Hoogewerf
1989: Freddie Williams
1990: Mike McLean
1991: Freddie Williams
1992: Sasha Smiljanic
1993: Freddie Williams
1994: Freddie Williams
1995: William Best
1996: Freddie Williams
1997: Zach Whitmarsh
1998: Zach Whitmarsh
1999: Zach Whitmarsh
2000: Zach Whitmarsh
2001: Achraf Tadili
2002: Zach Whitmarsh
2003: Gary Reed
2004: Gary Reed
2005: Gary Reed

1500 metres
Prior to 1967, the event was variously held over 1500 metres or one mile.
1946: ?
1947: Cliff Salmond
1948: Bill Parnell
1949: Jack Hutchins
1950: John Ross
1951: Bill Parnell
1952: John Ross
1953: Selwyn Jones
1954: Rich Ferguson
1955: L. Weiss
1956: John Moule
1957: 
1958: Ed Morton
1959: Randy Mason
1960: Geoff Eales
1961: 
1962: Jim Irons
1963: Ergas Leps
1964: Ergas Leps
1965: Ergas Leps
1966: Ergas Leps
1967: Dave Bailey
1968: Norm Trerise
1969: Norm Trerise
1970: Ergas Leps
1971: Ergas Leps
1972: Bill Smart
1973: Paul Craig
1974: Dave Hill
1975: Peter Spir
1976: Dave Weicker
1977: Paul Craig
1978: Paul Craig
1979: John Craig
1980: John Craig
1981: John Craig
1982: Peter Spir
1983: Dave Reid
1984: Paul Williams
1985: Dave Reid
1986: Dave Campbell
1987: Dave Campbell
1988: Dave Campbell
1989: Colin Mathieson
1990: Dan Bertoia
1991: Graham Hood
1992: Kevin Sullivan
1993: Kevin Sullivan
1994: Kevin Sullivan
1995: Kevin Sullivan
1996: Allan Klassen
1997: Graham Hood
1998: Allan Klassen
1999: Graham Hood
2000: Kevin Sullivan
2001: Graham Hood
2002: Ryan McKenzie
2003: Kevin Sullivan
2004: Kevin Sullivan
2005: Kevin Sullivan

5000 metres
Prior to 1967, the event was variously held over 5000 metres or three miles.
1946: ?
1947: Adrien Pronovost
1948: Cliff Salmond
1949: Rich Ferguson
1950: Rich Ferguson
1951: Lyle Garbe
1952: Rich Ferguson
1953: Selwyn Jones
1954: Henry Kennedy
1955: Roland Michaud
1956: Ron Wallingford
1957: Doug Kyle
1958: Doug Kyle
1959: Doug Kyle
1960: Geoff Eales
1961: Bruce Kidd
1962: Bruce Kidd
1963: 
1964: Bruce Kidd
1965: Dave Ellis
1966: Ray Haswell
1967: Dave Ellis
1968: Bob Finlay
1969: Bob Finlay
1970: Jerome Drayton
1971: Ken French
1972: Grant McLaren
1973: Dan Shaughnessy
1974: John Sharp
1975: Grant McLaren
1976: Louis Groarke
1977: Paul Bannon
1978: Peter Butler
1979: Paul Williams
1980: Greg Duhaime
1981: Peter Butler
1982: Phil Laheurte
1983: Paul Williams
1984: Paul Williams
1985: Rob Lonergan
1986: Paul Williams
1987: Paul McCloy
1988: Paul Williams
1989: John Castellano
1990: Chris Weber
1991: Marc Oleson
1992: Phil Ellis
1993: Dave Reid
1994: Jeff Schiebler
1995: Jeff Schiebler
1996: Jason Bunston
1997: Jeff Schiebler
1998: Jeff Schiebler
1999: Jeff Schiebler
2000: Sean Kaley
2001: Jeremy Deere
2002: Sean Kaley
2003: Sean Kaley
2004: Reid Coolsaet
2005: Reid Coolsaet

10,000 metres
Prior to 1967, the event was variously held over 10,000 metres, five miles or six miles.
1946: Walter Fedorick
1947: Ray Martin
1948: Don James
1949: Walter Fedorick
1950: Selwyn Jones
1951: Lyall Sundberg
1952: Lyle Garbe
1953: Selwyn Jones
1954: Selwyn Jones
1955: Roland Michaud
1956: Doug Kyle
1957: Doug Kyle
1958: Gordon Dickson
1959: Doug Kyle
1960: Doug Kyle
1961: Orville Atkins
1962: Bruce Kidd
1963: Dave Ellis
1964: Bruce Kidd
1965: 
1966: Dave Ellis
1967: Dave Ellis
1968: Jerome Drayton
1969: Jerome Drayton
1970: Jerome Drayton
1971: Jerome Drayton
1972: Dan Shaughnessy
1973: Dan Shaughnessy
1974: Dan Shaughnessy
1975: Jerome Drayton
1976: Doug Scorrar
1977: Paul Bannon
1978: Jerome Drayton
1979: Roger Martindill
1980: Peter Butler
1981: Peter Butler
1982: Peter Butler
1983: Peter Butler
1984: Alain Bordeleau
1985: Paul McCloy
1986: Paul McCloy
1987: Peter Maher
1988: Art Boileau
1989: Paul McCloy
1990: Carey Nelson
1991: Carey Nelson
1992: Janik Lambert
1993: Dave Reid
1994: Brendan Matthias
1995: Bruce Deacon
1996: Jason Bunston
1997: 
1998: Steve Boyd
1999: Sean Kaley
2000: Jeff Schiebler
2001: Jeff Schiebler
2002: Jeff Schiebler
2003: Jeff Schiebler
2004: Jeff Schiebler
2005: Mark Bomba
2006: Scott Simpson

Half marathon
2004: Steve Osadiuk
2005: Mark Bomba

Marathon
The 1946 marathon was an unofficial event. The 1972 marathon course was overly long by one kilometre.
1946: Gérard Côté
1947: Albert Morton
1948: Gérard Côté
1949: Paul Collins
1950: Paul Collins
1951: Walter Fedorick
1952: Paul Collins
1953: Gérard Côté
1954: ?
1955: Gordon Dickson
1956: George Hillier
1957: Gordon Dickson
1958: Gordon Dickson
1959: Gordon Dickson
1960: Gordon Dickson
1961: 
1962: 
1963: Doug Kyle
1964: Gordon Dickson
1965: 
1966: Andy Boychuk
1967: Andy Boychuk
1968: Andy Boychuk
1969: Chris Steer
1970: Andy Boychuk
1971: John Cliff
1972: Jerome Drayton
1973: Jerome Drayton
1974: Tom Howard
1975: Brian Maxwell
1976: Doug Scorrar
1977: Mike Dyon
1978: Rich Hughson
1979: Ken Inglis
1980: Brian Maxwell
1981: John Hill
1982: Mike Dyon
1983: Art Boileau
1984: Dave Edge
1985: Roger Schwegel
1986: Mike Dyon
1987: Mike Dyon
1988: Gordon Christie
1989: Peter Maher
1990: Ashley Dustow
1991: Michael Petrocci
1992: Not held
1993: Not held
1994: Not held
1995: Not held
1996: Not held
1997: Not held
1998: Not held
1999: Not held
2000: Bruce Deacon
2001: Bruce Deacon
2002: Bruce Deacon
2003: Not held
2004: Matthew McInnes
2005: Jim Finlayson
2006: Charles Bedley

3000 metres steeplechase
1959: Ron Wallingford
1960: Ron Wallingford
1961: Heike Vanderwal
1962: Heike Vanderwal
1963: 
1964: John Valiant
1965: Heike Vanderwal
1966: Heike Vanderwal
1967: Heike Vanderwal
1968: Ray Varey
1969: Ray Varey
1970: Ray Varey
1971: Chris McCubbins
1972: Chris McCubbins
1973: Graham Hutchison
1974: Joe Sax
1975: Brian Stride
1976: Peter Spir
1977: Joe Sax
1978: Dean Child
1979: Phil Laheurte
1980: Greg Duhaime
1981: Greg Duhaime
1982: Greg Duhaime
1983: Marc Adam
1984: Greg Duhaime
1985: Graeme Fell
1986: Graeme Fell
1987: Graeme Fell
1988: Graeme Fell
1989: Graeme Fell
1990: Alain Boucher
1991: Zeba Crook
1992: Jeff Schiebler
1993: Graeme Fell
1994: Zeba Crook
1995: Graeme Fell
1996: Henry Klassen
1997: Joël Bourgeois
1998: Joël Bourgeois
1999: Joël Bourgeois
2000: Joël Bourgeois
2001: Joël Bourgeois
2002: Joël Bourgeois
2003: Matt Kerr
2004: David Milne
2005: Matt Kerr

110 metres hurdles
Prior to 1967, the event was variously held over 110 metres or 120 yards.
1946: ?
1947: 
1948: Kim Kimbark
1949: Gordon Crosby
1950: Gordon Crosby
1951: Pete Steward
1952: Gordon Crosby
1953: Gordon Crosby
1954: Norman Williams
1955: Norman Williams
1956: Peter Stanger
1957: 
1958: Peter Stanger
1959: Bob Meldrum
1960: Bob Meldrum
1961: 
1962: Bill Gairdner
1963: Bill Gairdner
1964: Chris Nuttall
1965: 
1966: Bill Gairdner
1967: George Neeland
1968: Brian Donnelly
1969: George Neeland
1970: Tony Nelson
1971: Brian Donnelly
1972: Tony Nelson
1973: George Neeland
1974: George Neeland
1975: George Neeland
1976: Daniel Taillon
1977: Pat Fogarty
1978: Harold Gretzinger
1979: Pat Fogarty
1980: Pat Fogarty
1981: Mark McKoy
1982: Mark McKoy
1983: Mark McKoy
1984: Mark McKoy
1985: Mark McKoy
1986: Mark McKoy
1987: Mark McKoy
1988: Mark McKoy
1989: Michael Brodeur
1990: Mark McKoy
1991: Mark McKoy
1992: Tim Kroeker
1993: Tim Kroeker
1994: Tim Kroeker
1995: Tim Kroeker
1996: Shaun Wilcox
1997: Tony Branch
1998: Andrew Lissade
1999: Adrian Woodley
2000: Adrian Woodley
2001: Adrian Woodley
2002: Charles Allen
2003: Charles Allen
2004: Charles Allen
2005: Karl Jennings

220 yards hurdles
1950: Bruce Springbett
1951: Pete Steward
1952: ?
1953: Gordon Crosby

400 metres hurdles
Prior to 1967, the event was variously held over 400 metres or 440 yards.
1946: ?
1947: ?
1948: Bill Larochelle
1949: Bill Larochelle
1950: 
1951: Pete Steward
1952: Keith Holmes
1953: ?
1954: Murray Gaziuk
1955: Jack McRoberts
1956: B. Ingley
1957: 
1958: George Shepherd
1959: George Shepherd
1960: George Shepherd
1961: George Shepherd
1962: George Shepherd
1963: John Passmore
1964: Bill Gairdner
1965: Wesley Brown
1966: Bill Gairdner
1967: Robert McLaren
1968: ; Wes Brooker (Canadian Champion)
1969: Brian Donnelly
1970: Glen Smith
1971: Bill Gairdner
1972: John Konihowski
1973: David Jarvis
1974: Gladstone Williams
1975: Hamlin Grange
1976: Mike Forgrave
1977: Mike Forgrave
1978: Gladstone Williams
1979: Ian Newhouse
1980: Bill Siegman
1981: Ian Newhouse
1982: Ian Newhouse
1983: Lloyd Guss
1984: Lloyd Guss
1985: John Graham
1986: Pierre Leveille
1987: John Graham
1988: John Graham
1989: John Graham
1990: Craig Hutton
1991: Mark Jackson
1992: Aaron Derouin
1993: Mark Jackson
1994: Monte Raymond
1995: Michel Genest-Lahaye
1996: Monte Raymond
1997: Laurier Primeau
1998: Alexandre Marchand
1999: Alexandre Marchand
2000: Nick Stewart
2001: Monte Raymond
2002: Nick Stewart
2003: Adam Kunkel
2004: Adam Kunkel
2005: Adam Kunkel

High jump
1946: ?
1947: 
1948: Art Jackes
1949: Art Jackes
1950: Art Jackes
1951: David Blair
1952: A. Patterson
1953: Terry Anderson
1954: 
1955: Ian Hume
1956: Ken Money
1957: Ken Money
1958: Ken Money
1959: Will Foss
1960: Ken Money
1961: Dave Dorman
1962: Mike Penny
1963: 
1964: Steve Spencer
1965: John Hunter
1966: Steve Spencer
1967: Wilf Wedmann
1968: Wilf Wedmann
1969: Wilf Wedmann
1970: Michel Portman
1971: Wilf Wedmann
1972: John Beers
1973: John Beers
1974: John Beers
1975: Rick Cuttell
1976: Greg Joy
1977: Greg Joy
1978: Greg Joy
1979: Milton Ottey
1980: Claude Ferragne
1981: Milton Ottey
1982: Milton Ottey
1983: Milton Ottey
1984: Milton Ottey
1985: Alain Metellus
1986: Milton Ottey
1987: Milton Ottey
1988: Milton Ottey
1989: Alain Metellus
1990: Cory Siermachesky
1991: Vinton Bennett
1992: Cory Siermachesky
1993: Alex Zaliauskas
1994: Cory Siermachesky
1995: Charles Lefrançois
1996: Kwaku Boateng
1997: Mark Boswell
1998: Kwaku Boateng
1999: Kwaku Boateng
2000: Mark Boswell
2001: Mark Boswell
2002: Mark Boswell
2003: Mark Boswell
2004: Mark Boswell
2005: Kwaku Boateng

Pole vault
1946: ?
1947: 
1948: Murray Gayman
1949: Ron Miller
1950: Eddie Bretta
1951: 
1952: Ron Miller
1953: Ron Miller
1954: Ron Miller
1955: Ron Miller
1956: Ron Miller
1957: B. Land
1958: Robert Reid
1959: Robert Reid
1960: Al Groom
1961: Al Groom
1962: Al Groom
1963: 
1964: Gerry Moro
1965: Jean Lépine
1966: Gerry Moro
1967: Bob Raftis
1968: Gerry Moro
1969: Bob Raftis
1970: Bruce Simpson
1971: Bruce Simpson
1972: Bruce Simpson
1973: Allan Kane
1974: Ken Wenman
1975: Bruce Simpson
1976: Ken Wenman
1977: Harold Heer
1978: Glen Colivas
1979: Dave Parker
1980: Bruce Simpson
1981: Bruce Simpson
1982: Bruce Simpson
1983: George Barber
1984: Mark Baker
1985: Frank Bolduc
1986: Bob Ferguson
1987: Dave Steen
1988: Paul Just
1989: Doug Wood
1990: Doug Wood
1991: Doug Wood
1992: Paul Just
1993: Doug Wood
1994: Owen Clements
1995: Curt Heywood
1996: Paul Just
1997: Jeff Hayhoe
1998: Rob Pike
1999: Jason Pearce
2000: Jason Pearce
2001: Rob Pike
2002: Rob Pike
2003: John Zubyck
2004: Todd Zubyck
2005: Rob Hanson

Long jump
1946: ?
1947: Ed Catalano
1948: Lionel Fournier
1949: Robert Pierce
1950: Robert Pierce
1951: Alan Craib
1952: Pat Galasso
1953: Pat Galasso
1954: 
1955: Graham Turnbull
1956: David Stafford
1957: R. Campbell
1958: Jack Smyth
1959: Jack Smyth
1960: Emmett Smith
1961: 
1962: Emmett Smith
1963: Roger Mercier
1964: 
1965: George Britten
1966: Emmett Smith
1967: Bill Greenough
1968: Bill Greenough
1969: Michel Charland
1970: Mike Mason
1971: Mike Mason
1972: Jim Buchanan
1973: Rick Cuttell
1974: Barry Boyd
1975: Rick Cuttell
1976: Richard Rock
1977: Dave Steen
1978: Richard Rock
1979: Richard Rock
1980: Richard Rock
1981: Dave Burton
1982: Michel Boutet
1983: Ian James
1984: Richard Rock
1985: Kyle McDuffie
1986: Ian James
1987: Kyle McDuffie
1988: Glenroy Gilbert
1989: Edrick Floréal
1990: Edrick Floréal
1991: Ian James
1992: Ian James
1993: Edrick Floréal
1994: Ian James
1995: Ian Lowe
1996: Trevino Betty
1997: Ran Huget
1998: Maurice Ennis
1999: Richard Duncan
2000: Ian Lowe
2001: Richard Duncan
2002: Kevin Grant
2003: Craig Cavanagh
2004: Maurice Ennis
2005: Maurice Ennis

Triple jump
1946: ?
1947: 
1948: Wallace Brown
1949: Earl Carey
1950: Bill Robinson
1951: 
1952: Alan Craib
1953: Vic Cassis
1954: Robert McLaughlin
1955: Robert McLaughlin
1956: Jack Smyth
1957: P. Cadeau
1958: Jack Smyth
1959: Jack Smyth
1960: Jack Smyth
1961: B. McKague
1962: Howard Jackson
1963: Fred Wyers
1964: 
1965: George Britten
1966: Bill Greenough
1967: Bill Greenough
1968: Bill Greenough
1969: Barrie Johnson
1970: John Konihowski
1971: David Watt
1972: Jim Buchanan
1973: David Vine
1974: Gerry Bell
1975: David Watt
1976: David Watt
1977: David Watt
1978: Michael Nepinak
1979: Ossie Sargent
1980: Michael Nepinak
1981: George Wright
1982: Lew Golding
1983: Lew Golding
1984: George Wright
1985: George Wright
1986: Edrick Floréal
1987: Edrick Floréal
1988: Edrick Floréal
1989: Edrick Floréal
1990: Edrick Floréal
1991: Edrick Floréal
1992: Karl Dyer
1993: Karl Dyer
1994: George Wright
1995: Richard Duncan
1996: Jean-Robert Morin
1997: Oral Ogilvie
1998: Oral Ogilvie
1999: Richard Duncan
2000: Oral Ogilvie
2001: Evgueni Timofeev
2002: Shawn Peters
2003: Patrick Massok
2004: Shawn Peters
2005: Marlon Nangle

Shot put
1946: ?
1947: Bob Bartlett
1948: Eric Coy
1949: Eric Coy
1950: 
1951: George Hills
1952: Fred Ruish
1953: Stan Raike
1954: Stan Raike
1955: Stan Raike
1956: Stan Raike
1957: 
1958: Stan Raike
1959: Stan Raike
1960: Stan Raike
1961: 
1962: Dave Steen
1963: Jack Christopher
1964: Ain Roost
1965: Dave Steen
1966: Dave Steen
1967: Dave Steen
1968: Dave Steen
1969: Dave Steen
1970: Bruce Pirnie
1971: Mike Mercer
1972: Bruce Pirnie
1973: Bruce Pirnie
1974: Bruce Pirnie
1975: Bruce Pirnie
1976: Bishop Dolegiewicz
1977: Bishop Dolegiewicz
1978: Bruno Pauletto
1979: Bishop Dolegiewicz
1980: Bruno Pauletto
1981: Bishop Dolegiewicz
1982: Bishop Dolegiewicz
1983: Bruno Pauletto
1984: Luby Chambul
1985: Mike Spiritoso
1986: Luby Chambul
1987: Rob Venier
1988: Rob Venier
1989: Lorne Hilton
1990: Peter Dajia
1991: Peter Dajia
1992: Scott Cappos
1993: Scott Cappos
1994: Scott Cappos
1995: Scott Cappos
1996: Brad Snyder
1997: Jason Tunks
1998: Brad Snyder
1999: Brad Snyder
2000: Jason Gervais
2001: Brad Snyder
2002: Brad Snyder
2003: Brad Snyder
2004: Brad Snyder
2005: Dylan Armstrong

Discus throw
1946: ?
1947: Svein Sigfusson
1948: Eric Coy
1949: Svein Sigfusson
1950: 
1951: Robert Adams
1952: Roy Pella
1953: Stan Raike
1954: Roy Pella
1955: Bob Bazos
1956: Roy Pella
1957: 
1958: Fred Sontag
1959: John Pavelich
1960: Stan Raike
1961: Fred Sontag
1962: Stan Raike
1963: Bob Simmons
1964: Len Flately
1965: Dave Steen
1966: George Puce
1967: Dave Steen
1968: George Puce
1969: George Puce
1970: Dave Harrington
1971: Ain Roost
1972: Ain Roost
1973: Ain Roost
1974: Ain Roost
1975: Bishop Dolegiewicz
1976: Borys Chambul
1977: Borys Chambul
1978: Borys Chambul
1979: Robert Gray
1980: Borys Chambul
1981: Jack Harkness
1982: Borys Chambul
1983: Robert Gray
1984: Robert Gray
1985: Robert Gray
1986: Ray Lazdins
1987: Ray Lazdins
1988: Ray Lazdins
1989: Ray Lazdins
1990: Ray Lazdins
1991: Ray Lazdins
1992: Ray Lazdins
1993: Ray Lazdins
1994: Ray Lazdins
1995: Jason Tunks
1996: Jason Tunks
1997: Jason Tunks
1998: Jason Tunks
1999: Jason Tunks
2000: Jason Tunks
2001: Jason Tunks
2002: Jason Tunks
2003: Jason Tunks
2004: Jason Tunks
2005: Jason Tunks

Hammer throw
1946: ?
1947: Ross McIssac
1948: Svein Sigfusson
1949: Svein Sigfusson
1950: ?
1951: Bob Johnson
1952: T. Waugh
1953: Not held
1954: 
1955: Not held
1956: Stan Raike
1957: Not held
1958: 
1959: Stan Raike
1960: Dave Steen
1961: 
1962: Bill Kerr
1963: Bill McIntyre
1964: 
1965: Jan Versteeg
1966: Gerry Wohlfarth
1967: Mike Cairns
1968: Mike Cairns
1969: Gary Salmond
1970: Gary Salmond
1971: Rob Roeder
1972: Gary Salmond
1973: Gary Salmond
1974: Gary Salmond
1975: Murray Keating
1976: Scott Neilson
1977: Murray Keating
1978: Scott Neilson
1979: Scott Neilson
1980: Scott Neilson
1981: Harold Willers
1982: Harold Willers
1983: Harold Willers
1984: Harold Willers
1985: Valentin Chumak
1986: Darren McFee
1987: Darren McFee
1988: Darren McFee
1989: Darren McFee
1990: Evan Brown
1991: Evan Brown
1992: Boris Stoikos
1993: Boris Stoikos
1994: Boris Stoikos
1995: James Fahie
1996: Wes Boudreau
1997: John Stoikos
1998: John Stoikos
1999: Ian Maplethorpe
2000: Dylan Armstrong
2001: Dylan Armstrong
2002: Dylan Armstrong
2003: Derek Woodske
2004: Jim Steacy
2005: Jim Steacy

Javelin throw
1946: Wallace Brown
1947: 
1948: Leo Roininen
1949: Leo Roininen
1950: Leo Roininen
1951: John Pavelich
1952: Hans Moks
1953: Hans Moks
1954: Paul Pvuuasalo
1955: Hans Moks
1956: Olav Mask
1957: Hans Moks
1958: Hans Moks
1959: Lou Liepins
1960: Norman Walters
1961: 
1962: Dave Baxter
1963: Steve Baker
1964: Glenn Arbeau
1965: 
1966: Zenon Andrusyshyn
1967: William Heikkila
1968: William Heikikla
1969: Stu Hennings
1970: 
1971: Rick Dowswell
1972: André Claude
1973: Phil Olsen
1974: Phil Olsen
1975: Phil Olsen
1976: Phil Olsen
1977: Gheorghe Megelea
1978: Gheorghe Megelea
1979: John Corazza
1980: Gheorghe Megelea
1981: Gheorghe Megelea
1982: Phil Olsen
1983: Phil Olsen
1984: Laslo Babits
1985: Laslo Babits
1986: Peter Massfeller
1987: Mike Olma
1988: Mike Mahovlich
1989: Mike Mahovlich
1990: Stephen Feraday
1991: Louis Breault
1992: Stephen Feraday
1993: Stephen Feraday
1994: Larry Steinke
1995: Erin Bevans
1996: Erin Bevans
1997: Erin Bevans
1998: Erin Bevans
1999: Erin Bevans
2000: Scott Russell
2001: Scott Russell
2002: Scott Russell
2003: Scott Russell
2004: Scott Russell
2005: Scott Russell
2006  Trevor Snyder

Weight throw
1953: 
1955: ?. D'Hondt

Decathlon
1946: Lionel Fournier
1947: ?
1948: Lionel Fournier
1949: ?
1950: ?
1951: ?
1952: Bob Adams
1953: ?
1954: ?
1955: Don Steen
1956: Don Steen
1957: ?
1958: ?
1959: George Stulac
1960: George Stulac
1961: ?
1962: Bill Gairdner
1963: ?
1964: Bill Gairdner
1965: Gerry Moro
1966: Ron Parker
1967: Dave Dorman
1968: Dave Dorman
1969: Steve Spencer
1970: Gordon Stewart
1971: Toni Putzi
1972: Gerry Moro
1973: Barry Lange
1974: Gordon Stewart
1975: John Gamble
1976: Zenon Smiechowski
1977: Zenon Smiechowski
1978: Zenon Smiechowski
1979: Zenon Smiechowski
1980: Steve Kemp
1981: Rob Town
1982: Dave Steen
1983: Milan Popadich
1984: Milan Popadich
1985: Greg Haydenluck
1986: Dave Steen
1987: Greg Haydenluck
1988: Richard Hesketh
1989: Mike Smith
1990: Mike Smith
1991: Garth Peet
1992: Garth Peet
1993: David Cook
1994: Mike Smith
1995: Mike Smith
1996: Matt Jeffrey
1997: Antonie Scholtz
1998: Dave Stewart
1999: Mike Nolan
2000: Mike Nolan
2001: Mike Nolan
2002: Mike Nolan
2003: Mike Nolan
2004: Josef Karas
2005: James Holder

10 kilometres walk
The 1952 event was held on a track.
1952: Ferd Hayward

20 kilometres walk
From 1973 to 1988, plus 1997, the event was held on a track. In 1984 and 1987, both track and road championships were contested at this distance.
1965: Karl-Heinz Merschenz
1966:  & Karl-Heinz Merschenz
1967: Felix Cappella
1968: Felix Cappella
1969: Felix Cappella
1970: Not held
1971: Frank Johnson
1972: Karl-Heinz Merschenz
1973: Marcel Jobin
1974: Marcel Jobin
1975: Marcel Jobin
1976: Marcel Jobin
1977: Marcel Jobin
1978: Marcel Jobin
1979: Marcel Jobin
1980: Marcel Jobin
1981: Marcel Jobin
1982: Marcel Jobin
1983: Marcel Jobin
1984: Marcel Jobin (track) & Daniel Lévesque (road)
1985: Guillaume LeBlanc
1986: Guillaume LeBlanc
1987: Michel Lafortune (track) & Daniel Lévesque (road)
1988: Guillaume LeBlanc
1989: Guillaume LeBlanc
1990: Guillaume LeBlanc
1991: Guillaume LeBlanc
1992: Tim Berrett
1993: Tim Berrett
1994: Not held
1995: Martin St. Pierre
1996: Arturo Huerta
1997: Tim Berrett
1998: Tim Berrett
1999: Arturo Huerta
2000: Arturo Huerta
2001: Tim Berrett
2002: Arturo Huerta
2003: Tim Berrett
2004: Tim Berrett
2005: Tim Berrett

20-mile walk
1966: Felix Cappella

50 kilometres walk
The event was held on a track in 1965.
1952: Ferd Hayward
1953: Not held
1954: Not held
1955: Not held
1956: Not held
1957: Not held
1958: Not held
1959: Not held
1960: Not held
1961: Not held
1962: Not held
1963: Alex Oakley
1964: Not held
1965: Karl-Heinz Merschenz
1966: Alex Oakley
1967: Karl-Heinz Merschenz
1968: Felix Cappella
1969: Not held
1970: Pat Farrelly
1971: Felix Cappella
1972: 
1973: Pat Farrelly
1974: Not held
1975: Not held
1976: Not held
1977: Not held
1978: Not held
1979: Glen Sweazy
1980: Not held
1981: Not held
1982: Not held
1983: Guillaume LeBlanc
1984: François Lapointe
1985: Not held
1986: Mark Henderson
1987: Martin Archambault
1988: 
1989: Not held
1990: Not held
1991: Not held
1992: Not held
1993: Not held
1994: Not held
1995: Not held
1996: Tim Berrett
1997: Gordon Mosher
1998: Not held
1999: Not held
2000: Not held
2001: Not held
2002: Not held
2003: Not held
2004: Not held
2005: Not held

Cross country
1952: ?
1953: ?
1954: Harry Kennedy
1955: ?
1956: ?
1957: Gordon Dickson
1958: ?
1959: Gordon Dickson
1960: Bruce Kidd
1961: Doug Kyle
1962: Dave Ellis
1963: Bruce Kidd
1964: Doug Kyle
1965: John Cliff
1966: Dave Ellis
1967: Bob Fahy
1968: ?
1969: Jerome Drayton
1970: Bob Finlay
1971: Richard Munro
1972: Grant McLaren
1973: Grant McLaren
1974: 
1975: Louis Groarke
1976: 
1977: Chris McCubbins
1978: Peter Butler
1979: 
1980: Vernon Iwancin
1981: Peter Butler
1982: Vernon Iwancin
1983: Paul McCloy
1984: Paul McCloy
1985: Paul McCloy
1986: Paul McCloy
1987: Paul McCloy
1988: 
1989: 
1990: Paul McCloy
1991: Richard Charette
1992: Richard Charette
1993: Joseph Kibur
1994: Jeff Schiebler
1995: Jason Bunston
1996: Jason Bunston
1997: Christian Weber
1998: Jeff Schiebler
1999: Kevin Sullivan
2000: Mark Bomba
2001: 
2002: Simon Bairu
2003: Simon Bairu
2004: Simon Bairu
2005: Simon Bairu

Women

60 metres/yards
The event was held variously over 60 metres or 60 yards, depending on the venue.
1947: Millie Cheater
1948: Not held
1949: Not held
1950: Not held
1951: Not held
1952: Not held
1953: Eleanor Miller
1954: Not held
1955: Maureen Rever
1956: Not held
1957: Eleanor Haslam
1958: Not held
1959: Valerie Jerome
1960: Not held
1961: Gillian Harding

75 yards
1951: Ann Reid
1954:

100 metres
1947: Jean Atkinson
1948: Pat Jones
1949: Eleanor McKenzie
1950: Not held
1951: Eleanor McKenzie
1952: Eleanor McKenzie
1953: Eleanor Miller
1954: 
1955: Maureen Rever
1956: Eleanor Haslam
1957: Diane Matheson
1958: Eleanor Haslam
1959: Valerie Jerome
1960: Nancy Lewington
1961: Gillian Harding
1962: Yvonne Breeden
1963: Joanne Rootsaert
1964: Irene Piotrowski
1965: Judy Dallimore
1966: Marjorie Bailey
1967: Irene Piotrowski
1968: Irene Piotrowski
1969: Irene Piotrowski
1970: Patty Loverock
1971: Stephanie Berto
1972: Patty Loverock
1973: Marjorie Bailey
1974: Marjorie Bailey
1975: Patty Loverock
1976: Patty Loverock
1977: Margot Howe
1978: Patty Loverock
1979: Angella Taylor-Issajenko
1980: Angella Taylor-Issajenko
1981: Angella Taylor-Issajenko
1982: Angella Taylor-Issajenko
1983: Angella Taylor-Issajenko
1984: Angella Taylor-Issajenko
1985: Angela Bailey
1986: Angella Taylor-Issajenko
1987: Angella Taylor-Issajenko
1988: Angella Taylor-Issajenko
1989: France Gareau
1990: Angela Bailey
1991: Karen Clarke
1992: Angella Taylor-Issajenko
1993: Karen Clarke
1994: Simone Tomlinson
1995: Karen Clarke
1996: Tarama Perry
1997: Philomena Mensah
1998: Philomena Mensah
1999: Philomena Mensah
2000: Esi Benyarku
2001: Venolyn Clarke
2002: Atia Weekes
2003: Erica Witter
2004: Krysha Bailey
2005: Toyin Olupona

200 metres
1947: Betty Mitchell
1948: Diane Foster
1949: Eleanor McKenzie
1950: Not held
1951: Eleanor McKenzie
1952: Louelle Law
1953: Joan Wood
1954: Gwen Hobbins
1955: Dorothy Kozak
1956: Diane Matheson
1957: Diane Matheson
1958: Eleanor Haslam
1959: Heather Campbell
1960: Eleanor Haslam
1961: Maureen Bardoe
1962: Yvonne Breeden
1963: Maureen Bardoe
1964: Yvonne Breeden
1965: Judy Dallimore
1966: Jan Maddin
1967: Irene Piotrowski
1968: Joan Fisher
1969: Irene Piotrowski
1970: Patty Loverock
1971: Stephanie Berto
1972: Joyce Yakubowich
1973: Patty Loverock
1974: Marjorie Bailey
1975: Joyce Yakubowich
1976: Patty Loverock
1977: Margot Howe
1978: Patty Loverock
1979: Angella Taylor-Issajenko
1980: Angella Taylor-Issajenko
1981: Angella Taylor-Issajenko
1982: Angella Taylor-Issajenko
1983: Angella Taylor-Issajenko
1984: Angella Taylor-Issajenko
1985: Angela Bailey
1986: Angella Taylor-Issajenko
1987: Angella Taylor-Issajenko
1988: Jillian Richardson
1989: Jillian Richardson
1990: Stacey Bowen
1991: Karen Clarke
1992: Karen Clarke
1993: Stacey Bowen
1994: Stacey Bowen
1995: Karen Clarke
1996: Foy Williams
1997: Philomena Mensah
1998: Philomena Mensah
1999: Philomena Mensah
2000: LaDonna Antoine-Watkins
2001: LaDonna Antoine-Watkins
2002: 
2003: Erica Witter
2004: Lami Oyewumi
2005: Adrienne Power

400 metres
1963: Abby Hoffman
1964: Abby Hoffman
1965: Cecelia Carter
1966: Jan Maddin
1967: Margaret Cheskin
1968: Joan Fisher
1969: Gayle Olinekova
1970: Yvonne Saunders
1971: Marg MacGowan
1972: Joyce Yakubowich
1973: Yvonne Saunders
1974: Maureen de St. Croix
1975: Marg MacGowan
1976: Ann Mackie
1977: Bev Krotowski
1978: Rachelle Campbell
1979: Charmaine Crooks
1980: Charmaine Crooks
1981: Marita Payne
1982: Molly Killingbeck
1983: Molly Killingbeck
1984: Marita Payne
1985: Molly Killingbeck
1986: Charmaine Crooks
1987: Jillian Richardson
1988: Charmaine Crooks
1989: Charmaine Crooks
1990: Charmaine Crooks
1991: Charmaine Crooks
1992: Camille Noel
1993: Camille Noel
1994: Stacey Bowen
1995: Charmaine Crooks
1996: Foy Williams
1997: LaDonna Antoine-Watkins
1998: LaDonna Antoine-Watkins
1999: Foy Williams
2000: LaDonna Antoine-Watkins
2001: Foy Williams
2002: 
2003: Foy Williams
2004: Danielle Kot

800 metres
1959: Noreen Deuling
1960: Pat Cole
1961: Joan Barnicott
1962: Abby Hoffman
1963: Abby Hoffman
1964: Abby Hoffman
1965: Abby Hoffman
1966: Abby Hoffman
1967: Roberta Picco
1968: Abby Hoffman
1969: Abby Hoffman
1970: Penny Werthner
1971: Penny Werthner
1972: Glenda Reiser
1973: Maureen de St. Croix
1974: Abby Hoffman
1975: Joan Wenzel
1976: Maureen McDermott
1977: Francine Gendron
1978: Debbie Campbell
1979: Ann Mackie-Morelli
1980: Ann Mackie-Morelli
1981: Brit McRoberts
1982: Grace Verbeek
1983: Brit McRoberts
1984: Camille Cato
1985: Renée Bélanger
1986: Renée Bélanger
1987: Mary Burzminski
1988: Renée Bélanger
1989: Ranza Clark
1990: Jeanette Wood
1991: Nicole Masil
1992: Sarah Howell
1993: Nicola Knapp
1994: Charmaine Crooks
1995: 
1996: Jean Fletcher
1997: Charmaine Crooks
1998: Diane Cummins
1999: Vicky Lynch-Pounds
2000: Diane Cummins
2001: Diane Cummins
2002: Diane Cummins
2003: Diane Cummins
2004: Diane Cummins
2005: Diane Cummins

1500 metres
1966: Roberta Picco
1967: Roberta Picco
1968: Cheryl Somers
1969: Noreen Leipens
1970: Penny Werthner
1971: Thelma Wright
1972: Glenda Reiser
1973: Glenda Reiser
1974: Thelma Wright
1975: Thelma Wright
1976: Donna Valaitis
1977: Debbie Pearson
1978: Penny Werthner
1979: Francine Gendron
1980: Brit McRoberts
1981: Debbie Scott-Bowker
1982: Debbie Scott-Bowker
1983: Debbie Scott-Bowker
1984: Debbie Scott-Bowker
1985: Debbie Scott-Bowker
1986: Brit McRoberts
1987: Debbie Scott-Bowker
1988: Lynn Kanuka-Williams
1989: Angela Chalmers
1990: Angela Chalmers
1991: Debbie Scott-Bowker
1992: Sarah Howell
1993: Angela Chalmers
1994: Angela Chalmers
1995: Leah Pells
1996: Sarah Howell
1997: Leah Pells
1998: Leah Pells
1999: Leah Pells
2000: Leah Pells
2001: Leah Pells
2002: Émilie Mondor
2003: Carmen Douma-Hussar
2004: Malindi Elmore
2005: Carmen Douma-Hussar

3000 metres
1974: Thelma Wright
1975: Kathy Prosser
1976: Donna Valaitis
1977: Debbie Pearson
1978: Shauna Miller
1979: Shauna Miller
1980: Geri Fitch
1981: Alison Wiley
1982: Debbie Scott-Bowker
1983: Lynn Kanuka-Williams
1984: Lynn Kanuka-Williams
1985: Ulla Marquette
1986: Lynn Kanuka-Williams
1987: Lynn Kanuka-Williams
1988: Alison Wiley
1989: Paula Schnurr
1990: Leah Pells
1991: Robyn Meagher
1992: Ulla Marquette
1993: Leah Pells
1994: Angela Chalmers

5000 metres
1995: Kathy Butler
1996: Tina Connelly
1997: Carol Howe
1998: Sherri Smith
1999: Kathy Butler
2000: Tina Connelly
2001: Courtney Babcock-Key
2002: Courtney Babcock-Key
2003: Émilie Mondor
2004: Émilie Mondor
2005: Megan Wright

10,000 metres
1982: Anne-Marie Malone
1983: Bev Bush
1984: Colette Desrosiers
1985: Jacqueline Gareau
1986: Carole Rouillard
1987: Nancy Tinari
1988: Carole Rouillard
1989: Carole Rouillard
1990: Carole Rouillard
1991: Carole Rouillard
1992: Jackie Mota
1993: Lisa Harvey
1994: Ulla Marquette
1995: Lyudmila Alexeef
1996: Lyudmila Alexeef
1997: Jackie Mota
1998: Jackie Mota
1999: Tina Connelly
2000: Lisa Harvey
2001: Tina Connelly
2002: Courtney Babcock-Key
2003: Courtney Babcock-Key
2004: Lucy Smith
2005: Tara Quinn-Smith
2006: Tara Quinn-Smith

Half marathon
2004: Tina Connelly
2005: Tara Quinn-Smith

Marathon
1976: Eleanor Thomas
1977: ?
1978: Chris Lavalee
1979: Sandra Davis
1980: Janet Welshaupt
1981: Linda Staudt
1982: Cindy Hamilton
1983: Cindy Hamilton
1984: Silvia Ruegger
1985: Bernadette Duffy
1986: Ellen Rochefort
1987: Marjory Stewart
1988: Jean Payette
1989: Ellen Rochefort
1990: Claire Kroshus
1991: Laura Konantz
1992: Not held
1993: Not held
1994: Not held
1995: Not held
1996: Not held
1997: Not held
1998: Not held
1999: Not held
2000: Véronique Vandersmissen
2001: Danuta Bartoszek
2002: Tania Jones
2003: Not held
2004: Nicole Stevenson
2005: Lyudmila Korchagina
2006: Lyudmila Korchagina

3000 metres steeplechase
1999: Karen Harvey
2000: Kristen Brennand
2001: Karen Sullivan
2002: Margaret Butler
2003: Tania Vander Meulen
2004: Haley Digel
2005: Lise Ogrodnick

80 metres hurdles
1947: Edith Skitch
1948: Rosella Thorne
1949: Rosella Thorne
1950: Not held
1951: Alice Foltz
1952: Shirley Eckel
1953: Shirley Eckel
1954: Gwen Hobbins
1955: May Saunders
1956: Shirley Eckel
1957: Sheila Hood
1958: Pat Power
1959: Pat Power
1960: Sally McCallum
1961: Gillian Harding
1962: Jenny Meldrum
1963: Jenny Meldrum
1964: Jenny Meldrum
1965: Jenny Meldrum
1966: Cathy Chapman
1967: Jenny Meldrum
1968:

100 metres hurdles
1969: Penny May
1970: Liz Damman
1971: Penny May
1972: Linda Wilson
1973: Wendy Taylor
1974: Sue Bradley
1975: Liz Damman
1976: Joanne MacLeod
1977: Diane Jones-Konihowski
1978: Sharon Lane
1979: Sharon Lane
1980: Sue Bradley
1981: Sharon Lane
1982: Sue Kameli
1983: Sue Kameli
1984: Sylvia Malgadey-Forgrave
1985: Cecilia Branch
1986: Faye Blackwood
1987: Karen Nelson
1988: Karen Nelson
1989: Karen Nelson
1990: Karen Nelson
1991: Karen Nelson
1992: Sonia Paquette
1993: Donalda Duprey
1994: Donalda Duprey
1995: Lesley Tashlin
1996: Sonia Paquette
1997: Keturah Anderson
1998: Keturah Anderson
1999: Keturah Anderson
2000: Perdita Felicien
2001: Angela Whyte
2002: Perdita Felicien
2003: Perdita Felicien
2004: Perdita Felicien
2005: Perdita Felicien

200 metres hurdles
1969: Peggy Busch
1970: Jill Pelland
1971: Penny May
1972: Jean Sparling
1973: Jean Sparling

400 metres hurdles
1974: Francine Gendron
1975: Francine Gendron
1976: Eleanor Mahal
1977: Francine Gendron
1978: Eleanor Mahal
1979: Wendy Davies
1980: Andrea Wachter
1981: Andrea Page
1982: Andrea Page
1983: Gwen Wall
1984: Andrea Page
1985: Gwen Wall
1986: Gwen Wall
1987: Gwen Wall
1988: Rosey Edeh
1989: Rosey Edeh
1990: Caroline Fontin
1991: Rosey Edeh
1992: Erica Peterson
1993: Rosey Edeh
1994: Donalda Duprey
1995: Rosey Edeh
1996: Donalda Duprey
1997: Donalda Duprey
1998: Karlene Haughton
1999: Karlene Haughton
2000: Karlene Haughton
2001: Karlene Haughton
2002: Karlene Haughton
2003: Tawa Babatunde
2004: Tawa Babatunde
2005: Tawa Dortch

High jump
1947: Pat Flemming
1948: Doreen Dredge
1949: Shirley Gordon Olafsson
1950: Not held
1951: Alice Whitty
1952: Alice Whitty
1953: Arlene Weeks
1954: Ruth Hendron
1955: Carol Hemming
1956: Alice Whitty
1957: Carol Hemming
1958: Alice Whitty
1959: Alice Whitty
1960: Alice Whitty
1961: Francis Wigson
1962: Sandra Barr
1963: Dianne Gerace
1964: Dianne Gerace
1965: Susan Nigh
1966: Susan Nigh
1967: Susan Nigh
1968: Debbie Brill
1969: Debbie Brill
1970: Debbie Brill
1971: Debbie Brill
1972: Louise Hanna-Walker
1973: Louise Hanna-Walker
1974: Debbie Brill
1975: Louise Hanna-Walker
1976: Debbie Brill
1977: Maggie Woods
1978: Debbie Brill
1979: Brigitte Reid
1980: Debbie Brill
1981: Scarlet Vanden Bos
1982: Debbie Brill
1983: Debbie Brill
1984: Debbie Brill
1985: Jeannie Cockroft
1986: Shari Orders
1987: Leslie Estwick
1988: Linda Cameron
1989: Leslie Estwick
1990: Roberta Thoen
1991: Leslie Estwick
1992: Nathalie Belfort
1993: Wanita Dykstra
1994: Sara McGladdery
1995: Sara McGladdery
1996: Christina Livingston
1997: Christina Livingston
1998: Nicole Forrester
1999: Nicole Forrester
2000: Wanita May
2001: Wanita May
2002: Nicole Forrester
2003: Wanita May
2004: Wanita May
2005: Whitney Evans

Pole vault
1995: Rebecca Chambers
1996: Jackie Honey
1997: Trista Bernier
1998: Trista Bernier
1999: Rebecca Chambers
2000: Ardin Harrison
2001: Stephanie McCann
2002: Stephanie McCann
2003: Stephanie McCann
2004: Dana Ellis
2005: Dana Ellis

Long jump
1947: Elaine Silburn
1948: Elaine Silburn
1949: Elaine Silburn
1950: Not held
1951: Dawn Josephs
1952: Dawn Josephs
1953: Rosella Thorne
1954: Rosella Thorne
1955: Annabelle Murray
1956: Annabelle Murray
1957: Maureen Rever
1958: Maureen Rever
1959: Valerie Jerome
1960: Sally McCallum
1961: Jenny Meldrum
1962: Joanne Rootsaert
1963: Dianne Gerace
1964: Dianne Gerace
1965: Jenny Meldrum
1966: Jenny Meldrum
1967: Jenny Meldrum
1968: Joan Hendry
1969: Brenda Eisler
1970: Yvonne Saunders
1971: Penny May
1972: Brenda Eisler
1973: Brenda Eisler
1974: Ann Bryan
1975: Brenda Eisler
1976: Diane Jones-Konihowski
1977: Diane Jones-Konihowski
1978: Diane Jones-Konihowski
1979: Jill Ross-Giffen
1980: Jill Ross-Giffen
1981: Nicole Ali
1982: Karen Nelson
1983: Carol Galloway
1984: Carol Galloway
1985: Donna Smellie
1986: Sharon Clarke
1987: Tracy Smith
1988: Tracy Smith
1989: Tania Redhead
1990: Tania Redhead
1991: 
1992: Vanessa Monar
1993: Vanessa Monar-Enweani
1994: Catherine Bond-Mills
1995: Nicole Devonish
1996: Leslie Estwick
1997: 
1998: Vanessa Monar-Enweani
1999: Vanessa Monar-Enweani
2000: Alice Falaiye
2001: Alice Falaiye
2002: Tracy Dulmage-Sprague
2003: Alice Falaiye
2004: Alice Falaiye
2005: Alice Falaiye

Triple jump
From 1987 to 1989 the women's triple jump was held but did not have championship status.
1987: Pam Prophet
1988: Laverne Clarke
1989: Laverne Clarke
1990: Laverne Clarke
1991: Laverne Clarke
1992: Kelly Dinsmore
1993: Kelly Dinsmore
1994: Michelle Hastick
1995: Kelly Dinsmore
1996: Kelly Dinsmore
1997: Michelle Hastick
1998: Michelle Hastick
1999: Michelle Hastick
2000: Althea Williams
2001: Michelle Hastick
2002: Althea Williams
2003: Althea Williams
2004: Althea Williams
2005: Althea Williams

Shot put
1947: Patricia Lawson
1948: Doreen Clough
1949: Joyce Brennan
1950: Not held
1951: ?
1952: Mary Lawrence
1953: Jackie MacDonald
1954: Jackie MacDonald
1955: Jackie MacDonald
1956: Jackie MacDonald
1957: Pat Dobie
1958: Jackie MacDonald
1959: Pat Dobie
1960: Sharon Cliffe
1961: Pat Dobie
1962: Nancy McCredie
1963: Nancy McCredie
1964: Nancy McCredie
1965: Nancy McCredie
1966: Nancy McCredie
1967: Nancy McCredie
1968: Maureen Dowds
1969: Joan Pavelich
1970: Marlene Kurt
1971: Diane Jones-Konihowski
1972: Joan Pavelich
1973: Diane Jones-Konihowski
1974: Jane Haist
1975: 
1976: Lucette Moreau
1977: Diane Jones-Konihowski
1978: Carmen Ionesco
1979: Rose Hauch
1980: Diane Jones-Konihowski
1981: Carmen Ionesco
1982: Carmen Ionesco
1983: Rose Hauch
1984: Rose Hauch
1985: Rose Hauch
1986: Melody Torcolacci
1987: Melody Torcolacci
1988: Shannon Kekula
1989: Melody Torcolacci
1990: Georgette Reed
1991: Melody Torcolacci
1992: Georgette Reed
1993: Georgette Reed
1994: Georgette Reed
1995: Georgette Reed
1996: 
1997: Georgette Reed
1998: Georgette Reed
1999: Georgette Reed
2000: Georgette Reed
2001: Georgette Reed
2002: Georgette Reed
2003: Georgette Reed
2004: Caroline Larose
2005: Caroline Larose

Discus throw
1947: Hazel Braithwaite
1948: Joyce Brennan
1949: Joyce Brennan
1950: Not held
1951: ?
1952: Joyce Brennan
1953: Joyce Brennan
1954: Helen Metchuk
1955: Jackie MacDonald
1956: Jackie MacDonald
1957: Pat Dobie
1958: Marie Depree
1959: Marie Depree
1960: Lydia Terry
1961: Marie Depree
1962: Pat Dobie
1963: Nancy McCredie
1964: Nancy McCredie
1965: Nancy McCredie
1966: Nancy McCredie
1967: Carol Martin
1968: Carol Martin
1969: Carol Martin
1970: Marlene Kurt
1971: Marlene Kurt
1972: Carol Martin
1973: 
1974: Jane Haist
1975: 
1976: Lucette Moreau
1977: Doreen Garner
1978: Carmen Ionesco
1979: Carmen Ionesco
1980: Lucette Moreau
1981: Carmen Ionesco
1982: Carmen Ionesco
1983: Sharon Curik
1984: Carmen Ionesco
1985: Gale Dolegiewicz
1986: Gale Dolegiewicz
1987: Gale Dolegiewicz
1988: Gale Dolegiewicz
1989: Gale Dolegiewicz
1990: Gale Dolegiewicz
1991: Anna Mosdell
1992: 
1993: Theresa Brick
1994: Anna Mosdell
1995: Georgette Reed
1996: Theresa Brick
1997: Georgette Reed
1998: Nicole Chimko
1999: Robin Lyons
2000: Tina McDonald
2001: Nicole Chimko
2002: Marie-Josée LeJour
2003: Tina McDonald
2004: Julie Bourgon
2005: Marie-Josée LeJour-McDonagh

Hammer throw
From 1987 to 1989 the women's hammer throw was held but did not have championship status.
1987: Theresa Brick
1988: Theresa Brick
1989: Theresa Brick
1990: Theresa Brick
1991: Theresa Brick
1992: Cathy Griffin
1993: Theresa Brick
1994: Theresa Brick
1995: Theresa Brick
1996: Theresa Brick
1997: Caroline Wittrin
1998: Caroline Wittrin
1999: Caroline Wittrin
2000: Michelle Fournier
2001: Caroline Wittrin
2002: Michelle Fournier
2003: Jennifer Joyce
2004: Jennifer Joyce
2005: Jennifer Joyce

Javelin throw
1947: Sylvia Fedoruk
1948: Rhoda Wurtele
1949: Nora Young
1950: Not held
1951: ?
1952: Mary Lawrence
1953: Joyce Brennan
1954: Mary Lawrence
1955: Margaret George
1956: Margaret George
1957: Pat Dobie
1958: Margaret George
1959: Wendy Kellond
1960: Pat Dobie
1961: Pat Dobie
1962: Pat Dobie
1963: Valerie Jensen
1964: Christa Leipert
1965: Nancy McCredie
1966: Jay Dahlgren
1967: Jay Dahlgren
1968: Jay Dahlgren
1969: Jay Dahlgren
1970: Val Peterson
1971: Val Peterson
1972: Jay Dahlgren
1973: Laurie Kern
1974: Jay Dahlgren
1975: Jay Dahlgren
1976: Alison Hayward
1977: Sue Gibson
1978: Alison Hayward
1979: Laurie Kern
1980: Laurie Kern
1981: Sue Gibson
1982: Monique Laprés
1983: Monique Laprés
1984: Cindy Crapper
1985: Céline Chartrand
1986: Kristy Evans
1987: Faye Roblin
1988: Isabelle Surprenant
1989: Cheryl Coker
1990: Lori LaRowe
1991: Isabelle Surprenant
1992: Isabelle Surprenant
1993: Eileen Volpatti
1994: Valerie Tulloch
1995: Isabelle Surprenant
1996: Signi MacNeil
1997: Sandy Taylor
1998: Nicole Chimko
1999: Andrea Bulat
2000: Dominique Bilodeau
2001: Dominique Bilodeau
2002: Dominique Bilodeau
2003: Dominique Bilodeau
2004: Dominique Bilodeau
2005: Dominique Bilodeau

Pentathlon
1964: Dianne Gerace
1965: Jenny Meldrum
1966: Joyce Madden
1967: Jenny Meldrum
1968: ?
1969: Diane Jones-Konihowski
1970: Jenny Meldrum
1971: ?
1972: ?
1973: Diane Jones-Konihowski
1974: Diane Jones-Konihowski
1975: Diane Jones-Konihowski
1976: Diane Jones-Konihowski
1977: Diane Jones-Konihowski
1978: Diane Jones-Konihowski
1979: Jill Ross-Giffen
1980:

Heptathlon
1981: Diane Jones-Konihowski
1982: Jill Ross-Giffen
1983: Jill Ross-Giffen
1984: Jill Ross-Giffen
1985: Alison Armstrong
1986: Linda Spenst
1987: Janet Scott
1988: Donna Smellie
1989: Catherine Bond-Mills
1990: Catherine Bond-Mills
1991: Catherine Bond-Mills
1992: Catherine Bond-Mills
1993: Catherine Bond-Mills
1994: Catherine Bond-Mills
1995: Catherine Bond-Mills
1996: Esther Medema
1997: Catherine Bond-Mills
1998: Catherine Bond-Mills
1999: Catherine Bond-Mills
2000: Nicole Haynes
2001: Jessica Zelinka
2002: Nicole Haynes
2003: Nicole Haynes
2004: Jessica Zelinka
2005: Jessica Zelinka

5000 metres walk
1970: Jocelyn Richard
1971: Not held
1972: Not held
1973: Not held
1974: Jacqueline Sauve
1975: Not held
1976: Jacinthe Théberge
1977: Lilly Whalen
1978: Lilly Whalen
1979: Hélène Daviau
1980: Ann Peel
1981: Ann Peel
1982: Ann Peel
1983: 
1984: Ann Peel
1985: Janice McCaffrey
1986: Ann Peel
1987: Ann Peel

10 kilometres walk
In 1988 two events were held, one on the track and one on roads. The 1997 event was held on a track.
1983: Ann Peel
1984: Ann Peel
1985: Not held
1986: Ann Peel
1987: Janice McCaffrey
1988: Ann Peel (track) & Alison Baker (road)
1989: Janice McCaffrey
1990: Pascale Grand
1991: Tina Poitras
1992: Corinne Whissel
1993: Alison Baker
1994: Janice McCaffrey
1995: Tina Poitras
1996: Tina Poitras
1997: Tina Poitras
1998: Janice McCaffrey
1999: Not held
2000: Not held
2001: Kim Cathro
2002: Holly Gerke
2003: Karen Foan
2004: Holly Gerke

20 kilometres walk
1997: Susan Hornung
1998: Holly Gerke
1999: Janice McCaffrey
2000: Janice McCaffrey
2001: Karen Foan
2002: Marina Crivello
2003: Karen Foan
2004: Marina Crivello
2005: Marina Crivello

Cross country
1962: ?
1963: Abby Hoffman
1964: Abby Hoffman
1965: Roberta Picco
1966: Brenda Mah
1967: Thelma Wright
1968: Thelma Wright
1969: 
1970: Shauna Miller
1971: Glenda Reiser
1972: Glenda Reiser
1973: Thelma Wright
1974: Thelma Wright
1975: Sheila Currie
1976: Donna Valaitis
1977: Magda Kubasiewicz
1978: Nancy Rooks
1979: Veronica Poryckyj
1980: Silvia Ruegger
1981: Tracy Kelly
1982: Nancy Rooks
1983: Wendy van Mierlo
1984: Carole Rouillard
1985: Elena Evanoff
1986: Nancy Rooks
1987: Brenda Shackleton
1988: Lucille Smith
1989: Lucille Smith
1990: Annick de Gooyer
1991: Lucille Smith
1992: Lucille Smith
1993: Paula Schnurr
1994: Leah Pells
1995: Kathy Butler
1996: Kathy Butler
1997: Lucille Smith
1998: Tina Connelly
1999: Tina Connelly
2000: Courtney Babcock-Key
2001: Sarah Dupre
2002: Émilie Mondor
2003: Émilie Mondor
2004: Rebecca Stallwood
2005: Carmen Douma-Hussar

References

Champions 1946–2005
Canadian Championships. GBR Athletics. Retrieved 2021-01-24.
Champions 1900–2003
CANADIAN CHAMPIONSHIPS MEDALLISTS WOMEN 1900-2003. Athletics Canada. Retrieved 2021-01-24.
CANADIAN CHAMPIONSHIPS MEDALLISTS MEN 1900-2003. Athletics Canada. Retrieved 2021-01-24.

Winners
 List
Canadian Championships
Track and field